"Pretty Like Drugs" is a song by British alternative rock band Queenadreena, released in 2002 from their album Drink Me. It was later included as a bonus track on the US release of the band's third album, The Butcher and the Butterfly after they left Rough Trade records and signed with One Little Indian.

Reception
Nigel Messenger of Phase9 called the single: "an excellent, heavy track with a pounding beat saturated with the sexy tones of lead singer KatieJane Garside." Rock Feedback said of the single: "Snarly riffs and the sound of a girl in desperation, panting away like an exhausted farmyard animal, marks "Pretty Like Drugs," the shockingly post-glam stomper new single from Queen Adreena."

Track listing

Personnel
KatieJane Garsidevocals
Crispin Grayguitar
Orson Wajihbass
Pete Howarddrums

References

2002 singles
2002 songs
Queenadreena songs